James Peter Spencer (born February 15, 1957) is an American former racing driver, team owner, and television commentator. He is best known for competing in NASCAR. He hosted the NASCAR-inspired talk show, What’s the Deal?, on Speed,  and was co-host, with John Roberts and Kenny Wallace, of Speed's pre-race and post-race NASCAR shows NASCAR RaceDay and NASCAR Victory Lane. Before retiring, Spencer had a segment on Speed's NASCAR Race Hub offering commentary and answering viewer questions (on Tuesdays and Thursdays). During his days racing modifieds, he was nicknamed "Mr. Excitement" for his aggressive racing style. Spencer is one of the few drivers to have won a race in all three of NASCAR's top series: the NASCAR Cup Series, the Xfinity Series, and the Camping World Truck Series.

Spencer's Cup wins both came in summer 1994 at the restrictor plate races at Daytona and Talladega.

Early life
Jimmy Spencer followed his father, Ed Spencer, Sr., commonly known as "Fast Eddie", in racing. Spencer started driving  Late Models in Pennsylvania. He captured his first win in the Late Model division at Port Royal Speedway in 1976. He moved to NASCAR Modifieds at Shangri-La Speedway (Owego, New York), then branched out to bigger events throughout the Northeast.

In 1984, Spencer was one of the top contenders for NASCAR's National Modified Championship, at a time when all sanctioned races counted toward that title; after running over sixty races, he was second to Richie Evans in the final standings. When NASCAR changed the National Modified Championship into the smaller-schedule Winston Modified Tour (now the Whelen Modified Tour) in 1985, Spencer continued to run, and won the title in 1986 and 1987.

Spencer debuted in the Busch Series in 1985, finishing 19th at North Carolina Motor Speedway in the No. 67 Pontiac for Frank Cicci Racing, which was also his Modified team. The team ran twice in 1987 with a best-finish 36th, then ran the full season in 1988, finishing seventh in the point standings with 5 top-5's and 13 top-10's in the No. 34. In 1989, Spencer won his first career Busch race, the Mountain Dew 400 at Hickory Motor Speedway. Spencer later won another two that season at Orange County and Myrtle Beach, finishing 15th in the final standings.

1989–1994

In 1989, he moved to the Winston Cup Series, driving the No. 88 Crisco-sponsored Pontiac for Buddy Baker's team in 17 of the 29 races. He posted three top 10's and finished 34th in points. He then ran full-time in 1990, finishing in the top 10 twice for Rod Osterlund Racing in the No. 57 Heinz-sponsored Pontiac and finished 24th in points. In 1991, Spencer moved to the No. 98 Banquet Foods Chevrolet for Travis Carter Motorsports. Despite six top-10 finishes, Spencer dropped one position in the standings due to twelve DNFs. He began 1992 with Carter, but moved down to the Busch Series to drive the No. 20 Daily's 1st Ade-sponsored Oldsmobile for Dick Moroso after Carter's team folded early in the season. He responded with his second career wins at both Myrtle Beach Speedway and Orange County Speedway.

Late in the 1992 season, Spencer joined Bobby Allison Motorsports' Cup team and posted three top-fives in the last four races of the season. He signed to drive Allison's No. 12 Meineke-sponsored Ford Thunderbird full-time in 1993, and finished in the top 5 five times, resulting in a career-best 12th-place in the final standings. In 1994, he drove the No. 27 McDonald's-sponsored Ford for Junior Johnson and won his first two and only career Cup races, the Pepsi 400 at Daytona, and the DieHard 500 at Talladega. On the final lap at Daytona, Spencer won his first career Cup race passing Ernie Irvan for his only scored lap lead. He also won his first career pole award for the Tyson Holly Farms 400 at North Wilkesboro Speedway. Other than that, the season was a huge disappointment, as he would only score two further Top 10 finishes and finished the season 29th in the standings.

1995–2001

After finishing 29th in the standings in 1994, Spencer left to reunite with Travis Carter, who was then fielding the No. 23 Smokin' Joe's-sponsored Ford. He finished in the Top 10 four times in 1995 and in 1996, Spencer had two Top 5's en route to a 15th-place finish in points. He fell to 20th in 1997.

In 1998, Winston/No Bull became his team's new primary sponsor and he was 11th in points when he suffered injuries at the Brickyard 400, forcing him to sit out the next two races to recover and fall to 14th in points. During the season, Spencer formed his own NASCAR team, Spencer Motor Ventures, which fielded the No. 12 Zippo-sponsored Chevrolet Monte Carlo in the Busch Series for himself and Boris Said, Steve Grissom, and Rick Mast. The team expanded to two cars in 1999, fielding the No. 12 and the No. 5 Schneider National-sponsored Chevy for Dick Trickle. In 2000, he moved his team up to Cup to run the road course races with Boris Said in the No. 23 Federated Auto Parts-sponsored Ford Taurus. The team ceased operations at the end of the season.

After a 20th-place finish in 1999, Winston left the team, and Kmart became the team's new sponsor, causing Spencer to switch to the No. 26 to accommodate the new sponsor, who was already backing the No. 66 car driven by Spencer's teammate, Darrell Waltrip. Spencer had two Top 5's and in 2001 won the pole positions at Indianapolis Motor Speedway and Lowe's Motor Speedway and advanced to 16th in points.

2002–present
For the 2002 season, Spencer would join Chip Ganassi Racing and drive the No. 41 Target-sponsored Dodge Intrepid. He began the season by failing to qualify for the Daytona 500, then had a streak of four top-5 qualifying efforts, including at Bristol Motor Speedway, where he started fourth and was leading the race when he was bumped by Kurt Busch to win, starting a long rivalry between the two. After another DNQ at Watkins Glen International, Spencer was released from the ride at the end of the season, causing him to file a lawsuit against the Ganassi organization, saying his dismissal was a violation of his contract. Also in 2002, Spencer won his last career Busch Series race, the Food City 250 at Bristol driving for Phoenix Racing.

Spencer joined Ultra Motorsports in 2003, piloting the No. 7 Sirius Satellite Radio-sponsored Dodge. After some on-track incidents with Kurt Busch, Spencer confronted Busch after the GFS Marketplace 400 while Busch was still in his car. He was suspended for the next week's race, the Sharpie 500 at Bristol Motor Speedway while Busch was placed on probation. Despite the events that took place at Michigan, he had four top 10s and ended the season 29th in points. He was also hired to drive three races for in the No. 2 Team ASE Racing Dodge Ram for Ultra's Truck Series team, winning the pole and the race in his second start at New Hampshire International Speedway. He became a part-owner of the Cicci organization that season, when he put Stuart Kirby in Cicci's No. 34 United States Air Force-sponsored Chevy, but that partnership soon dissolved. He continued to remain involved as a part-owner, when he leased his shop to Bang! Racing in the Craftsman Truck Series in 2004.

He began 2004 with Ultra's Cup team at the Daytona 500, but when the team closed down due to a lack of sponsorship, he replaced Kevin Lepage at Morgan-McClure Motorsports, which had also been running unsponsored. Spencer's best finish that season had been 17th at Dover after gaining sponsors in Featherlite Trailers and Lucas Oil, when on October 25, he was arrested after trying to interfere with the police, who had a warrant to arrest his son for vandalism. The incident cost Spencer his job at Morgan-McClure, and he sat out the rest of 2004.

Spencer returned to the No. 2 Ultra truck in 2005. While he failed to win a race, he had nine top-10 finishes and finished 12th in points. He came close to a victory, however, in the season opener at Daytona. He held the lead late in the race and held off 2004 series champion Bobby Hamilton until just before the caution came out on the last lap. Assuming he was in the lead when NASCAR froze the field, he completed the caution lap then pulled into victory lane, only to be told by an official that, in fact, he had finished second. He also ran part-time in Cup, running nine races in the No. 50 Arnold Motorsports Dodge, and one race apiece for Peak Fitness Racing and R&J Racing.

When Arnold was unable to locate a sponsor and Ultra closed its doors following a fallout with the Ford Motor Company, Spencer began working full-time on the Speed TV network. He had run both Cup races at Pocono Raceway for Furniture Row Racing in 2006, finishing 32nd and 36th, respectively. Spencer then worked full-time as an analyst for SPEED TV on NASCAR RaceDay, NASCAR Victory Lane and eventually was the host of his own show What's The Deal?, along with Ray Dunlap in 2010.  The show was canceled the same year. His segments on the Tuesday and Thursday editions of NASCAR Race Hub were done from the studio of that show.

In his television commentary, Spencer talked about the NASCAR highlights while he often feigning sobs with his gag called "The Crying Towel", for which a driver gets the crying towel and a fake cigar if they complain about something that cannot be punishable. In 2012 Spencer named his "Crying Towel" segment as "(Driver) Radio Sweetheart."

On November 21, 2013, on NASCAR Race Hub, Spencer said he was still not ready to announce his retirement yet, despite not racing in several years. As he still has not raced in a long time (and still has not announced retirement) he has not showed up on NASCAR Race Hub since late 2013. Spencer has been inactive in the NASCAR community since leaving Race Hub.

Motorsports career results

NASCAR
(key) (Bold – Pole position awarded by qualifying time. Italics – Pole position earned by points standings or practice time. * – Most laps led.)

Nextel Cup Series

Daytona 500

Busch Series

Craftsman Truck Series

ARCA Hooters SuperCar Series
(key) (Bold – Pole position awarded by qualifying time. Italics – Pole position earned by points standings or practice time. * – Most laps led.)

References

External links
NASCAR.com Biography

2008 Interview by NASCAR.com
2006 Interview by NASCAR.com

1957 births
Living people
People from Berwick, Pennsylvania
American Speed Association drivers
NASCAR drivers
NASCAR team owners
Racing drivers from Pennsylvania
Trans-Am Series drivers
Chip Ganassi Racing drivers
Michael Waltrip Racing drivers